William Lee Ball (January 2, 1781 – February 29, 1824) was a nineteenth-century slave owner and politician from Virginia who served four terms in the  U.S. House of Representatives from 1817 to until his death in 1824.

Biography
Born in Lancaster County, Virginia, Ball received a liberal schooling as a child.

Political career 
He was a member of the Virginia House of Delegates from 1805 to 1806 and again from 1810 to 1814. He served as a paymaster in the War of 1812 and was assigned to the 92nd Virginia Regiment.

He later went on to serve in the Virginia State Senate from 1814 to 1817. He was elected a Democratic-Republican and later a Crawford Republican to the United States House of Representatives in 1816.

Death 
He served in the House from 1817 until his death in Washington D.C. on February 29, 1824. 

He was interred in Congressional Cemetery.

See also
List of United States Congress members who died in office (1790–1899)

References

External links

1781 births
1824 deaths
People from Lancaster County, Virginia
Democratic-Republican Party members of the United States House of Representatives from Virginia
Members of the Virginia House of Delegates
Virginia state senators
People from Virginia in the War of 1812
Burials at the Congressional Cemetery
19th-century American politicians